Events in the year 1940 in Paraguay.

Incumbents
President of Paraguay: José Félix Estigarribia until September 7, then Higinio Moríñigo
Minister of War and Navy: Higinio Moríñigo until September 7, then Paulino Ántola

Events
February 19 - President Estigarribia dissolves the legislature and suspends the Constitution
August 4 - Paraguayan constitutional referendum, 1940
September 7 - President Estigarribia and his wife are killed in a plane crash in Agapuey while on a tour of the interior.

Births

Deaths
September 7 - Jose Felix Estigarribia, general and President, plane crash

References

 
1940s in Paraguay
Years of the 20th century in Paraguay
Paraguay
Paraguay